Coca-Cola İçecek A.Ş. is an anchor bottler and a part of the Coca-Cola System. It is 50.3% owned by Anadolu Efes, 20.1% owned by The Coca-Cola Company, 3.7% owned by Özgörkey Holding, and the remaining 25.9% publicly traded on the Turkish stock exchanges. It is the 5th largest bottler in the Coca-Cola System in terms of sales volume. The company is headquartered in Istanbul.

The company is the bottler of Coca-Cola products in Azerbaijan, Iraq, Kazakhstan, Kyrgyzstan, Pakistan, Syria, Tajikistan, Uzbekistan, Turkmenistan, and Jordan, as well as its home country of Turkey.

The company is included at the BIST Sustainability Index as of November 2015.

References

External links 
 Company website

Coca-Cola bottlers
Drink companies of Turkey
Food and drink companies based in Istanbul
Food and drink companies established in 1964